Justice Chan Htoon (23 April 1906 – 16 May 1988) was Attorney General and Associate Justice of the Supreme Court of Burma, and the architect of the first constitution of Burma in 1947. He was educated at Ananda College in Ceylon (now Sri Lanka), where he passed matriculation in 1928. Afterward, he studied at the University College, Rangoon and became a lawyer in 1931, after he was called to the Bar by the Inner Temple. Chan Htoon served as the President of the World Fellowship of Buddhists from 1958 to 1963. He was imprisoned from 1963 to 1967 by the Burmese military government. After his release he devoted the rest of his life to Buddhism including supporting the task of translating Pali texts into English.

He was married to Khin Khin Thein and had several children (eight children), including Ye Htoon.

References

External links
Google.co.jp

1906 births
1988 deaths
Imprisonment and detention
20th-century Burmese lawyers
Alumni of Ananda College
University of Yangon alumni
People from British Burma
Attorneys general of Burma

my:ချန်ထွန်း၊ ဦး(တရားဝန်ကြီး)